Mohd. Shohid Ali (1914 – 1992) was a Bangladeshi advocate.

Career
Ali was a lawyer and a politician in Pakistan and Bangladesh. He was born in Chandbhorang (Biswanath subdivision), Sylhet in 1914 to M Musson Ali and Korful Nessa. Ali was the middle son of three siblings. He received his early education in Chandbhorang, and received his high school diploma with honors in 1932. In 1936, Ali received his Bachelor of Arts degree from M.C. College, Sylhet, and in 1940 his law degree (LLB) from the University of Dhaka. The same year, Ali joined the Sylhet Bar Association as an advocate and became the first Muslim lawyer from Biswanath subdivision. In 1949 he was appointed as an advocate for Dhaka High Court. The same year, Ali became the Vice President of the Local Board and the Secretary of the Muslim League branch of North Sylhet.

After the passing of the Lahore Resolution until the creation of Pakistan, Ali remained highly active in the Pakistan Movement. In 1952, he became the Secretary of All Sylhet District Muslim League branch. In 1970, he was appointed the Vice President of All Pakistan Council Muslim League. During that time he also became the acting President of the party when the original President, Mian Mumtaz Muhammad Khan Daultana resigned.

In 1969, Ali became the Public Prosecutor (PP) and the same year he also became the Secretary of Sylhet Bar Association. In 1975-76 and 1985, he was elected the President of the Bar Association.

In 1976 when Muslim League was reinstated in Bangladesh, Ali became the Vice President. After that he became the President of the divided Muslim League. In 1986, he became one of the Vice Presidents of Bangladesh Nationalist Party (BNP) and the President of the Sylhet District branch.

In 1992, Ali was awarded the gold medal by the Sylhet Lawyer's Association for the completion of his 50th year as a lawyer.

Personal life

Ali married Khairunnessa Moni, the daughter of Magistrate of Sylhet, Ahmadullah and the youngest sister of Altaf Husain, a journalist and a long-term editor of the prestigious Pakistani newspaper Dawn. Ali raised three daughters and two sons. All his children are well established in life.

In 1992, Ali died in Sylhet.

20th-century Bangladeshi lawyers
1914 births
1992 deaths
People from Bishwanath Upazila
Bangladesh Nationalist Party politicians
University of Dhaka alumni
20th-century Pakistani lawyers